is the 13th single of Japanese rock band Asian Kung-Fu Generation, released on December 2, 2009. There is a limited edition version with a DVD.

Track listing

Personnel
Masafumi Gotoh – lead vocals, rhythm guitar
Kensuke Kita – lead guitar, background vocals
Takahiro Yamada –  bass, background vocals
Kiyoshi Ijichi – drums
Asian Kung-Fu Generation – producer
Yusuke Nakamura – single cover art

Charts

References 
CDJapan

Asian Kung-Fu Generation songs
2009 singles
Songs written by Masafumi Gotoh
2009 songs
Ki/oon Music singles